"Without You" (stylised as all caps) is a song by Australian rapper and singer the Kid Laroi from the deluxe "Savage" edition of his debut mixtape F*ck Love (2020). It was released to alternative radio on 18 December 2020 as the fifth overall single from the mixtape.

A remix of "Without You" with American singer Miley Cyrus was released on 30 April 2021. The Kid Laroi had first discussed a forthcoming collaboration with Cyrus in an interview with Billboard on 6 April. The remix itself was first previewed in a TikTok video by Cyrus on 21 April, and the release date was confirmed by both artists on 23 April. It was also Cyrus' first release since signing with Columbia Records in March 2021. It is Cyrus' first remix as a featured artist.

The song debuted on the Billboard Hot 100 at number 63, on the week of 19 December 2020, and peaked at number 23 in May 2021. The remix, featuring Cyrus, gave the song a boost in popularity later and gave the song a new peak of number eight, becoming Laroi's first top-ten song as lead artist and highest-charting single until the release of "Stay". It is also his first number-one single in Australia.

At the 2021 ARIA Music Awards, the song was nominated for Best Hip Hop Release and Song of the Year.

At the APRA Music Awards of 2022, the song was nominated for Most Performed Australian Work and Most Performed Hip Hop/Rap Work, winning the latter.

Background 
The Kid Laroi cited Sia as the inspiration for "Without You", who he listened to a lot. According to Laroi, he was "going through some shit with girls", and while he and Omer Fedi were at his old house, he asked Fedi to play something on his guitar that "Sia would sing over". Fedi then strummed the chords that became "Without You". The song was finished in that one night, consisting for the longest time of "just a bounce of [Laroi's] vocals" and one guitar. Production was added a week before the release of F*ck Love (Savage). Different types of drums were tried out on the track, but the decision was eventually made to exclude them, with Laroi explaining that "it takes away the whole feeling from it".

Composition and lyrics 
"Without You" is an acoustic emo rap and folk-pop ballad with a rock edge. Following a basic chord progression, Laroi performs the song with "hoarse, almost grunted vocals" that are "pushed to the upper limits of their range". The spite-filled song details the aftermath of a breakup and how the pain of separation cuts deeper than expected. It sees Laroi lamenting about saying all the wrong things and ending up alone: "You cut out a piecе of me, and now I bleed internally / Left hеre without you / Without you." The remix with Miley Cyrus provides a back-and-forth conversation and stays mostly faithful to the original. Cyrus takes over some of Laroi's lines and contributes a new verse: "Feels like sleeping with a ghost / I called you up to let you know / I really wish that we could've got this right."

TikTok trend 
In December 2020, the song started trending on the video-sharing app TikTok, with videos set to the lyrics: "And I can't take it back, so in the past is where we'll leave it/So there you go/Can't make a wife out of a ho", referring to making light of less-than-ideal romantic situations.

Commercial performance 
In Australia, "Without You" entered the ARIA Singles Chart at number nine in December 2020, making it the highest debut of the week and Laroi's second appearance in the top ten. It ascended six places to number three a week later, securing Laroi's highest peak on the chart. In May 2021, after spending five weeks at the number two position, the song jumped to number one in its 22nd week on the back of the remix, becoming Laroi's first number-one single. It later broke the record for the most weeks at number one on Australia's radio airplay chart, surpassing the 13-week run of Bernard Fanning's "Wish You Well". "Without You" was certified seven-times platinum by the Australian Recording Industry Association (ARIA).

On the US Billboard Hot 100 chart dated 15 May 2021, "Without You" rose to number eight following the remix's release. It entered the top ten with 12.5 million streams and 8,500 sales in the 30 April–6 May tracking week and drew 43.5 million radio airplay audience impressions in the week ending 9 May. It marked Laroi's second visit to the chart's top ten after debuting and peaking at number ten as a featured artist on Juice Wrld and Marshmello's 2020 collaboration "Hate the Other Side" and his first as a lead artist. Cyrus collected her tenth top-ten hit on the Hot 100, her first since "Malibu" peaked at number ten in 2017. "Without You" also became both artists' first leader on the Hot Rock & Alternative Songs chart. It has since received a triple-platinum certification from the Recording Industry Association of America (RIAA).

"Without You" was Laroi's first single to reach the top 40 of the UK Singles Chart, rising 53 places to number 23 in December 2020. It subsequently became his first UK top-ten hit as it climbed to number seven the following month. The song peaked at number two, being blocked from the top spot by Olivia Rodrigo's "Drivers License", and was certified platinum by the British Phonographic Industry (BPI). "Without You" topped several record charts around Europe, including the Flanders region of Belgium, Finland, Norway, Portugal, and Slovakia. Globally, the song peaked at number ten on the Billboard Global 200 after the release of its remix, becoming Laroi and Cyrus' first top-ten entry on the chart.

Music video 
The song's accompanying music video premiered on 16 December 2020, and was directed by Steve Cannon. The video shows Laroi alone in a myriad of vast and expansive locations, including a salt lake and a snow-covered forest before getting "caked in the face" at a party. A video for the remix was also released on 30 April 2021.

Credits and personnel 
Credits adapted from Tidal.
 The Kid Laroi – vocals, songwriting
 Blake Slatkin – songwriting, production
 Omer Fedi – songwriting, production
 Billy Walsh – songwriting
 Donn Robb – record engineering
 Jon Castelli – mixing
 Josh Deguzman – assistant engineering
 Connor Hedge – assistant engineering
 Fili Filizzola – assistant engineering
 Hector Vega – assistant engineering
 Dale Becker – mastering

Charts

Weekly charts

Year-end charts

Certifications

Release history

References

External links
 
 

2020s ballads
2020 songs
2020 singles
APRA Award winners
Australian folk songs
Columbia Records singles
Folk ballads
The Kid Laroi songs
Miley Cyrus songs
Number-one singles in Australia
Number-one singles in Finland
Number-one singles in Norway
Number-one singles in Portugal
Pop ballads
Songs written by the Kid Laroi
Ultratop 50 Singles (Flanders) number-one singles
Songs written by Omer Fedi
Song recordings produced by Omer Fedi